On February 3, 1993, Ontario premier Bob Rae appointed six ministers without portfolio in the Ontario government.  These were not full members of cabinet but rather provided policy assistance to cabinet ministers. They were generally described as "junior ministers."

The only one of the original six ministers without portfolio who was assigned a specific job responsibility was Richard Allen, who oversaw international trade. The others did not have formally defined responsibilities. Some opposition politicians argued that these positions were unnecessary and duplicated the responsibilities of parliamentary assistants.

The positions were eliminated in 1995 by the government of Mike Harris.

Minister responsible for Economic Development
Richard Allen held this position from February 3, 1993, to August 18, 1994, when he was promoted to a full cabinet position. His replacement was Bob Huget, who served until June 26, 1995.

Minister responsible for Finance
Brad Ward held this position from February 3, 1993, to June 26, 1995, providing assistance to Finance Minister Floyd Laughren. He was given responsibility for overseeing public pre-budgetary consultations in 1994.

Minister responsible for Culture, Tourism and Recreation
Shirley Coppen held this position from February 3, 1993, to October 21, 1994, when she was promoted to a full cabinet position. Her replacement was Irene Mathyssen, who served until June 26, 1995.

Minister responsible for Health
Karen Haslam held this position from February 3 to June 14, 1993, when she resigned to protest the Rae government's Social Contact legislation. Her replacement was Shelley Wark-Martyn, who served until June 26, 1995.

Minister responsible for Municipal Affairs
Allan Pilkey held this position from February 3, 1993, to June 26, 1995.

Minister responsible for Education and Training
Shelley Wark-Martyn held this position from February 3 until June 17, 1993, when she was reassigned as Minister without portfolio responsible for Health. Her replacement was Mike Farnan, who served until his promotion to a full cabinet portfolio on October 21, 1994. Farnan, in turn, was replaced by Steve Owens, who served until June 26, 1995.

Other
Chief Government Whip Fred Wilson was also designated as a minister without portfolio in February 1993. His responsibilities were distinct from the other ministers without portfolio, and he was not considered a "junior minister."

Political history of Ontario
1993 in Ontario
1994 in Ontario
1995 in Ontario
1993 in Canadian politics
1994 in Canadian politics
1995 in Canadian politics
Ministers without portfolio